Agile may refer to:

 Agile, an entity that possesses agility

Project management
 Agile software development, a development method
 Agile construction, iterative and incremental construction method
 Agile learning, the application of incremental and iterative methods to learning processes
 Agile manufacturing, an organization able to respond quickly to customer needs and market changes

Military
 AIM-95 Agile, an air-to-air missile
 HMS Agile, a never-built Amphion-class submarine
 Project AGILE, a 1960s ARPA program
 USS Agile, two minesweepers

Other uses
 AGILE (satellite) (Astro-rivelatore Gamma a Immagini LEggero), an astronomical satellite of the Italian Space Agency
 Agile (horse) (born 1902), American thoroughbred racehorse, winner of the 1905 Kentucky Derby
 Agile (producer) (born 1975), Canadian hip-hop music producer
 Agile, a member of the X-Hunters in the video game Mega Man X2
 Chevrolet Agile, a subcompact car
 Wallis WA-116 Agile, a 1960s British autogyro, used in the James Bond film You Only Live Twice
 Agile (species group), a wasp species complex in the genus Pison
AGILE (Aircraft 3rd Generation MDO for Innovative Collaboration of Heterogeneous Teams of Experts) was an H2020 European funded project

See also
 Agile Project Management (book), by Jim Highsmith
 Agility (disambiguation)